The white-footed dunnart (Sminthopsis leucopus) is a marsupial that occurs on Tasmania and mainland Australia. It occurs along the coast and in inner Gippsland and Alpine areas up to 400 metres near Narbethong. In southern New South Wales, the white-footed dunnart is known to occur at elevations at least as high as 1000 metres. They weigh .

Habitat
Unlike the fat-tailed dunnart, this species requires forest and woodland cover of more than 50% of any square metre of heath understory or mid-story plant species. Other habitats include coastal tussock grasslands, sedgeland and wet heath. This dunnart has an individual range of about 120 square metres for both sexes, although this varies greatly among males, with some males acquiring territories of up to 1200 square metres. Male territories often overlap those of females.

Breeding and social organisation
The white-footed dunnarts mate in summer. The female white-footed dunnart will give birth in September or October, and up to ten joeys may be delivered. The white-footed dunnart will shortly die after the litter is born. After eight weeks old, the young will exit their mothers pouch, continue nursing for a month, then disperse.

Diet
The feeding habit of this 20–30 g species is similar to that of other dasyurids; it is an opportunistic feeder. Diet consists of invertebrates and reptiles of between 1 and 18 mm in length.

Subspecies
An unnamed subspecies of white-footed dunnart was recently found in northern Queensland. However, it has been named endangered due to its population scarcity.

References

</ref>

External links
Mammals of Tasmania – white-footed dunnart
White-footed dunnart
Pictures and facts about the white-footed dunnart

Dasyuromorphs
Mammals of Tasmania
Mammals of New South Wales
Mammals of Queensland
Mammals of Victoria (Australia)
Marsupials of Australia
Mammals described in 1842
Taxa named by John Edward Gray